"Do You Believe in Us" is a song by Cuban recording artist Jon Secada for his debut self-titled studio album and for his debut Spanish-language album Otro Día Más Sin Verte (1992). It was released in late 1992 as the third single from his Spanish-language album. The English version peaked at number 13 on the US Billboard Hot 100 and number three on the US Billboard Hot Adult Contemporary chart, while the Spanish version peaked at number one on the US Billboard Hot Latin Tracks chart. The song was also successful in Canada, reaching number three and topping the Adult Contemporary chart for one week. It was composed by Secada, Miguel Morejon, and Joseph Stefano, while Emilio Estefan Jr. produced the piece.

Production and success
Jon Secada was the backup vocalist for Cuban singer Gloria Estefan in 1989. Secada became close friends with Gloria and her husband, Emilio Estefan Jr., who helped guide Secada into the music business. Secada released his self-titled debut album in 1992 with SBK Records. The recording made up of English-language compositions and two Spanish-language tracks. It was certified triple platinum by the Recording Industry Association of America (RIAA), denoting shipments of three million copies. Secada, with the help from Emilio, decided to release an all Spanish-language album. During the recording sessions, Secada confirmed that Gloria helped translate his English-language recordings into Spanish. He said that she told him to record songs that he would be comfortably fine with singing throughout his career as a singer. She also told them not to "translate everything literally" but to "keep the same theme of the song in play."

"Cree en nuestro amor" was released as the third single from his Spanish album on 15 August 1992, peaking at number one on the US Billboard Hot Latin Tracks on 27 February 1993.

Track listings

US maxi-CD single
 "Do You Believe in Us" (hit version) – 3:36
 "Do You Believe in Us" (hot mix) – 3:57
 "Do You Believe in Us" (album version) – 3:58
 "Misunderstood" – 4:22

US 12-inch single
A. "Do You Believe in Us" (Musto mix) – 4:28
B. "Just Another Day" (Musto mix) – 6:34

US and Canadian cassette single
 "Do You Believe in Us" (radio version) – 3:36
 "Misunderstood" – 4:22

UK CD single
 "Do You Believe in Us" (LP version) – 3:58
 "Do You Believe in Us" (hit version) – 3:36
 "Do You Believe in Us" (hot mix) – 3:57
 "Misunderstood" – 4:22

UK 12-inch single
A1. "Do You Believe in Us" (LP version) – 3:58
B1. "Do You Believe in Us" (hit version) – 3:36
B2. "Do You Believe in Us" (hot mix) – 3:57

UK 7-inch single
A. "Do You Believe in Us" (LP version) – 3:58
B. "Misunderstood" – 4:22

European maxi-CD single
 "Do You Believe in Us" (Musto mix) – 4:28
 "Do You Believe in Us" (LP version) – 3:58
 "Just Another Day" (Musto mix) – 6:34
 "Otro día más sin verte" – 5:25

Australasian CD single
 "Do You Believe in Us" (hit version)
 "Do You Believe in Us" (hot mix)
 "Just Another Day" (radio Spanish edit)
 "Just Another Day" (extended radio version)
 "Misunderstood"

Japanese CD single
 "Do You Believe in Us" (hit version)
 "Do You Believe in Us" (hot mix)
 "Just Another Day" (radio edit)
 "Just Another Day" (club edit)

Credits and personnel
Credits are taken from the Otro Día Más Sin Verte liner notes.
 Jon Secada – vocals, composition
 Miguel Morejon – composition
 Joseph Stefano – composition
 Emilio Estefan Jr. – production

Charts

Weekly charts

Year-end charts

Release history

References

Bibliography

 
 

1992 singles
1992 songs
EMI Latin singles
Jon Secada songs
SBK Records singles
Spanish-language songs
Song recordings produced by Emilio Estefan
Songs written by Miguel A. Morejon
Songs written by Jon Secada